The  (literally 'Ghost Book' or 'Book of Spectres') is a collection of German ghost stories written by August Apel and Friedrich Laun and published in five volumes between 1810–1815. The fifth volume was also published as the first volume of Apel and Laun's  (1815–1818), which served as a continuation of the  series.

Stories

Translation
"" was translated by Thomas De Quincey and published anonymously as "The Fatal Marksman" in Popular Tales and Romances of the Northern Nations (1823). The same story was translated as "Der Freischütz; or, The Magic Balls" in Mary Diana Dods' Tales of the Wild and the Wonderful (1825), and anonymously as The Original Legend of Der Freischütz, or the Free Shot (1833). De Quincey also began a translation of "" in autumn 1824, but it was never published. Several other  stories were translated in magazines: "" as "The Dance of the Dead" in The Literary Magnet (1824), "" as "Death Tokens" in The European Magazine (1825), "" as "The Veiled Bride" in The Literary Magnet (1825), "" as "The Spirit's Summons" in Leigh Hunt's London Journal (1835), "" as "Two New Year's Nights" in The Court Magazine (1839), and "" as "Fatal Curiosity" in The New Monthly Belle Assemblée (1845).

The first three of these were then translated from French to English by Sarah Elizabeth Utterson in Tales of the Dead (1813). The remaining two were translated into English by A. J. Day, and included together with Utterson's translations in Fantasmagoriana: Tales of the Dead (2005). Marjorie Bowen also translated the first three from the French in Great Tales of Horror (1933) and More Great Tales of Horror (1935). Robert Pearse Gillies translated the first two directly from the German in German Stories (1826), and Charles John Tibbits produced an abridged translation of the first in Terrible Tales: German (1891).

Influence

Freischütz
The first tale in the first volume is "", a retelling by Apel of the Freischütz folktale. It formed the inspiration for Weber's opera Der Freischütz (1821).

References

Book series introduced in 1810
German short story collections
German folklore
Ghosts in written fiction